BIST may refer to:
Bansal Institute of Science and Technology
Busan Institute of Science and Technology
Built-in self-test
Borsa Istanbul